6244 Okamoto, provisional designation , is a background asteroid and binary system from the inner regions of the asteroid belt, approximately  in diameter. It was discovered on 20 August 1990, by Japanese astronomer Tsutomu Seki at the Geisei Observatory in Kōchi, Japan, and later named after Japanese school teacher Hiroshi Okamoto. The presumed S-type asteroid has a short rotation period of 2.9 hours. The discovery of its minor-planet moon was announced in October 2006.

Orbit and classification 

Okamoto is a non-family asteroid of the main belt's background population when applying the hierarchical clustering method to its proper orbital elements. Based on osculating Keplerian orbital elements, the asteroid has also been classified as a member of the Flora family, a giant asteroid family and the largest family of stony asteroids in the main-belt.

It orbits the Sun in the inner asteroid belt at a distance of 1.8–2.5 AU once every 3 years and 2 months (1,160 days; semi-major axis of 2.16 AU). Its orbit has an eccentricity of 0.15 and an inclination of 5° with respect to the ecliptic. The body's observation arc begins with a precovery taken at the Uccle Observatory in September 1933, nearly 57 years prior to its official discovery observation at Geisei.

Physical characteristics 

Okamoto is an assumed S-type asteroid, the most common spectral type in the inner asteroid belt.

Rotation period 

Several rotational lightcurves of Okamoto have been obtained from photometric observations since 2006. Analysis of the best-rated lightcurve gave a well-defined rotation period of 2.8958 hours with a consolidated brightness amplitude between 0.11 and 0.15 magnitude.

Diameter and albedo 

The Collaborative Asteroid Lightcurve Link assumes an albedo of 0.24 – taken from 8 Flora, the parent body of the Flora family – and derives a diameter of 4.59 kilometers based on an absolute magnitude of 13.9. Based on an assumed albedo of 0.14, the Johnston's archive estimates a diameter of 6.69 and 6.89 kilometer for the primary and the combined system, respectively (see below).

Satellite 

The discovery was announced on 19 October 2006. The mutual occultation events indicated the presence of a satellite 25% the size of its primary, which translates into an estimated diameter of  kilometers depending on the underlying size estimate of the primary.

Naming 

This minor planet was named after Japanese Entomologist and elementary-school teacher Hiroshi Okamoto (born 1915), who inspired the discoverer Tsutomu Seki with a love of the stars. The official naming citation was published by the Minor Planet Center on 10 June 1998.

References

External links 
 Asteroids with Satellites, Robert Johnston, johnstonsarchive.net
 Asteroid Lightcurve Database (LCDB), query form (info )
 Dictionary of Minor Planet Names, Google books
 Discovery Circumstances: Numbered Minor Planets (5001)-(10000) – Minor Planet Center
 
 

006244
Discoveries by Tsutomu Seki
Named minor planets
006244
19900820